Elena Valentini (born 30 March 1992) is an Italian racing cyclist. She rode at the 2014 UCI Road World Championships.

References

External links
 

1992 births
Living people
Italian female cyclists
Sportspeople from Bolzano
Cyclists from Trentino-Alto Adige/Südtirol